The Five Fists of Science is a steampunk graphic novel created by writer Matt Fraction and artist Steven Sanders. It was published in 2006 by Image Comics.

Plot
Nikola Tesla, Mark Twain and Bertha von Suttner combine forces to try to bring about world peace through superior firepower. The comic's introduction shows Twain explaining that the story does not concern itself very much with historical accuracy, and this assertion is borne out by the story: Twain and Tesla use scientific know-how, general trickery and media manipulation techniques to try to scare world leaders into following their noble path. In the company of several allies, the two are soon confronted by dark forces led by the dastardly Thomas Edison, John Pierpont Morgan, Andrew Carnegie, and Guglielmo Marconi. The inventors and financiers are collaborating on a bizarre new skyscraper, the Innsmouth Tower, on whose building site many construction workers have already died in mysterious accidents.

Awards
 2007: Nominated for "Favourite Original Graphic Novel" Eagle Award

See also
 War of the currents
 Providence Biltmore, a tower with similar urban legend claims
 List of steampunk works
 Mark Twain in popular culture
 Nikola Tesla in popular culture
 Thomas Edison in popular culture
 Cthulhu Mythos in popular culture
 The League of Extraordinary Gentlemen
 Necronauts
 Fort: Prophet of the Unexplained

External links
 Matt Fraction's home page
 Steven Sanders home page
 Genius Collision interview with Matt Fraction about the graphic novel.

2006 comics debuts
Cthulhu Mythos comics
Image Comics graphic novels
Steampunk comics
Cultural depictions of Mark Twain
Cultural depictions of Thomas Edison
Comics by Matt Fraction